Cataphatic theology or kataphatic theology is theology that uses "positive" terminology to describe or refer to the divine – specifically, God – i.e. terminology that describes or refers to what the divine is believed to be, in contrast to the "negative" terminology used in apophatic theology to indicate what it is believed the divine is not.

Etymology
"Cataphatic" comes from the Greek word κατάφασις kataphasis meaning "affirmation," coming from κατά kata (an intensifier) and φάναι phanai ("to speak").

Terminology

To speak of God or the divine kataphatically is thought by some to be by its nature a form of limiting to God or divine. This was one of the core tenets of the works of Pseudo-Dionysius the Areopagite. By defining what God or the divine is we limit the unlimited. A kataphatic way to express God would be that God is love. The apophatic way would be to state that God is not hate (although such description can be accused of the same dualism). Or to say that God is not love, as he transcends even our notion of love. Ultimately, one would come to remove even the notion of the Trinity, or of saying that God is one, because divine is above numberhood. That God is beyond all duality because God contains within himself all things and that God is beyond all things. The apophatic way as taught by Saint Dionysus was to remove any conceptual understanding of God that could become all-encompassing, since in its limitedness that concept would begin to force the fallen understanding of mankind onto the absolute and divine.

Eastern Orthodoxy
In the Eastern Orthodox Church, kataphatic theology can lead to some knowledge of God, but in an imperfect way. The perfect and only way which is fitting in regard of God is the apophatic way, as the kataphatic way has as its object that which exists, but God is beyond all existing.

Roman Catholicism
The Life of Moses - Gregory of Nyssa
St. Augustine
Anselm of Canterbury

Cataphatic treatment of ultimate reality in Buddhism 

Within Mahayana Buddhism, there is a species of scripture which essays a descriptive hint of Ultimate Reality by using positive terminology when speaking of it. This manifestation of Buddhism is particularly marked in the Dzogchen and Tathagatagarbha forms of the religion. Nirvana, for example, is equated with the True Self of the Buddha (pure, uncreated and deathless) in some of the Tathagatagarbha scriptures, and in other Buddhist tantras (such as the Kunjed Gyalpo or 'All-Creating King' tantra), the Primordial Buddha, Samantabhadra, is described as 'pure and total consciousness' - the 'trunk', 'foundation' and 'root' of all that exists.

In Gaudiya-vaishnavism
Gaudiya Vaishnavism speaks positively about transcendental qualities of Krishna. He has 64 transcendental qualities as Supreme Personality of Godhead, although these qualities are explained as non-material and beyond duality. The paradoxical nature of Krishna, the Absolute, being both beyond description and having qualities is discussed throughout the Gaudiya Vaishnavism literature. Among the 64 qualities of Krishna, 4 qualities are unique, which only Krishna has, these are:
He is the performer of wonderful varieties of pastimes (especially His childhood pastimes).
He is surrounded by devotees endowed with wonderful love of Godhead.
He can attract all living entities all over the universes by playing on His flute.
He has a wonderful excellence of beauty which cannot be rivaled anywhere in the creation.
There are other 60 qualities of Krishna, but Narayana also have them. Of these, 5 are special, which are not found in jiva-atmas or (according to the Vaishnava view) other Hindu deities, even Brahma or Shiva:
He has inconceivable potency.
Uncountable universes generate from His body.
He is the original source of all incarnations.
He is the giver of salvation to the enemies whom He kills.
He is the attractor of liberated souls.
Other 55 transcendental qualities are found in Brahma and Shiva, though they are common for Narayana and Krishna, but not found in jiva-atmas. And finally just 50 transcendental qualities can be found in jiva-atmas, who are not on the level of deities, but Krishna and Narayana also have these qualities. It also has to be carefully noted, that these qualities manifest in jiva-atmas only in minute qualities, and only if they become pure devotees of Krishna-Caitanya. On other hand, Krishna has these 64 qualities in full. See full list here: 64 Qualities of Lord Krishna.

See also
 Vladimir Lossky
 Pseudo-Dionysius the Areopagite
 Theosis (Eastern Christian theology)

References

Literature
Vladimir Lossky The Mystical Theology of the Eastern Church (1957 [1944]), reprints: SVS Press, 1997, James Clarke & Co Ltd, 1991.
 Clarence Edwin Rolt, Dionysius the Areopagite on the Divine Names and the Mystical Theology (1920).

Theology
Religious terminology